The Festival of German-Language Literature is a literary event which takes place annually in Klagenfurt, Austria. During this major literary festival which lasts for several days a number of awards are given, the major one being the Ingeborg Bachmann Prize, first awarded in 1977 and one of the most important awards for literature in the German language.

History 

In the mid seventies, the journalist and writer Humbert Fink and the chairman of the Austrian Radio and TV (ORF) studio in Carinthia at that time, Ernst Willner, decided to establish a literary competition based on an event held by Gruppe 47. They were able to enlist Marcel Reich-Ranicki amongst others onto the original jury. The result was the Festival of German-Language Literature, which has taken place annually since 1977 and is televised live by ORF.

The Ingeborg Bachmann Prize 

The main prize of the Festival is given in memory of Ingeborg Bachmann (25 June 1926 – 17 October 1973), one of the most distinguished Austrian writers. 

The prize winner is determined during a three-day reading event in which the invited candidates present their literary contributions, which have to be unpublished, to the nine-member professional jury and the public. Each presentation is about 25 minutes long and the original language of these contributions must be German. A moderator presents and guides the readings and the discussions of the jury and the writers have to convince both the jury and the public of the quality of their contributions.

In 2008, the jury was reduced to seven members, the competing writers from eighteen to fourteen. Since 2006, the Ingeborg Bachmann Prize has been endowed with 25,000 EUR.

Other prizes 
Several other literature prizes are awarded during the Festival, in total usually three to five awards. Over the years, additional sponsored prizes have been awarded:
 Deutschlandfunk Prize (EUR 12,500)
 Jury Prize, aka Kelag-Prize (since 2000, EUR 10,000)
 3sat Prize (given by 3sat, EUR 7,500)
 BKS Bank Audience Prize (since 2002, EUR 7,000)

 Ernst Willner Prize (EUR 7,000)
 Editor's special prize

Prize winners 

 2022 Festival
 Ingeborg Bachmann Prize: : Wechselkröte
 Deutschlandfunk Prize: : Einige Landesgrenzen weiter östlich, von hier aus gesehen
 Kelag Prize: : Im Falle des Druckabfalls
 3sat Prize: : Liste der Dinge, die nicht so sind, wie sie sein sollten
 BKS Prize of the Audience: : Staublunge

 2021 Festival
 Ingeborg Bachmann Prize: Nava Ebrahimi: Der Cousin
 Deutschlandfunk Prize: : Gewässer im Ziplock
 Kelag Prize: : Morgen wache ich auf und dann beginnt das Leben
 3sat Prize: : Mein Freund am See
 BKS Prize of the Audience: Necati Öziri 

 2020 Festival (virtual)
 Ingeborg Bachmann Prize: Helga Schubert: Vom Aufstehen
 Deutschlandfunk Prize: Lisa Krusche: Für bestimmte Welten kämpfen und gegen andere
 Kelag Prize: Egon Christian Leitner: Immer im Krieg
 3sat Prize: Laura Freudenthaler: Der heißeste Sommer
 BKS Prize of the Audience: Lydia Haider: Der große Gruß 

 2019 Festival
 Ingeborg Bachmann Prize: Birgit Birnbacher: Der Schrank
 Deutschlandfunk Prize: Leander Fischer: Nymphenverzeichnis Muster Nummer eins Goldkopf
 Kelag Prize: Julia Jost: Unweit vom Schakaltal
 3sat Prize: Yannic Han Biao Federer: Kenn ich nicht
 BKS Prize of the Audience: Ronya Othmann: Vierundsiebzig

 2018 Festival
 Ingeborg Bachmann Prize: Tanya Malyarchuk: Frösche im Meer
 Deutschlandfunk Prize: Bov Bjerg: SERPENTINEN
 Kelag Prize: Özlem Özgül Dündar: und ich brenne
 3sat Prize: Anna Stern: Warten auf Ava
 BKS Prize of the Audience: Raphaela Edelbauer: Das Loch

2017 Festival
 Ingeborg Bachmann Prize: Ferdinand Schmalz: mein lieblingstier heißt winter
 Deutschlandfunk Prize: John Wray: Madrigal
 Kelag Prize: Eckhart Nickel: Hysteria
 3sat Prize: Gianna Molinari: Loses Mappe
 BKS Prize of the Audience: Karin Peschka: Wiener Kindl

 2016 Festival
 Ingeborg Bachmann Prize: Sharon Dodua Otoo, Herr Gröttrup setzt sich hin
 Kelag Prize: , Los Alamos ist winzig
 3sat Prize: , WALTER NOWAK BLEIBT LIEGEN
 BKS Prize of the Audience: Stefanie Sargnagel, Penne vom Kika

 2015 Festival
 Ingeborg Bachmann Prize: Nora Gomringer, Recherche
 Kelag Prize: , Das Bein
 3sat Prize: , Das primäre Gefühl der Schuldlosigkeit
 BKS Prize of the Audience: , Das Bein
 2014 Festival 
 Ingeborg Bachmann Prize: , Wir waren niemals hier
 Kelag Prize: , Simeliberg 
 3sat Prize: Senthuran Varatharajah, Vor der Zunahme der Zeichen
 Ernst Willner Prize: , DOWN DOWN DOWN To The Queen Of Chinatown
 Prize of the Audience: , Ujjayi
 2013 Festival 
 Ingeborg Bachmann Prize: Katja Petrowskaja, Vielleicht Esther
 Kelag Prize: Verena Güntner, Es bringen
 3sat Prize: Benjamin Maack, „Wie man einen Käfer richtig fängt“ by Joachim Kaltenbach
 Ernst Willner Prize: Heinz Helle, Wir sind schön
 Prize of the Audience: Nadine Kegele, Scherben schlucken
 2012 Festival
 Ingeborg Bachmann Prize: Olga Martynowa for Ich werde sagen: ‚Hi!‘
 Kelag Prize: Matthias Nawrat for Unternehmer
 3sat Prize: Lisa Kränzler for Willste abhauen
 Ernst Willner Prize: Inger-Maria Mahlke
 Prize of the Audience: Cornelia Travnicek for Junge Hunde
 2011 Festival
 Ingeborg Bachmann Prize: Maja Haderlap for Im Kessel
 Kelag Prize: Steffen Popp for Spur einer Dorfgeschichte
 3sat Prize: Nina Bußmann for Große Ferien
 Ernst Willner Prize: Leif Randt for Schimmernder Dunst über CobyCounty
 Prize of the Audience:  Thomas Klupp for 9to5 Hardcore
 2010 Festival
 Ingeborg Bachmann Prize: Peter Wawerzinek for Rabenliebe
 Kelag Prize: Dorothee Elmiger for Einladung an die Waghalsigen
 3sat Prize: Judith Zander for Dinge, die wir heute sagten
 Ernst Willner Prize: Aleks Scholz for Google Earth
 Prize of the Audience: Peter Wawerzinek for Rabenliebe
 2009 Festival
 Ingeborg Bachmann Prize: Jens Petersen for Bis dass der Tod
 Kelag Prize: Ralf Bönt for Der Fotoeffekt
 3sat Prize: Gregor Sander for Winterfisch
 Ernst Willner Prize: Katharina Born for Fifty Fifty
 Prize of the Audience: Karsten Krampitz for Heimgehen
 2008 Festival
 Ingeborg Bachmann Prize: Tilman Rammstedt for Der Kaiser von China]
 Telekom Austria Prize: Markus Orths: Das Zimmermädchen
 3sat Prize: Patrick Findeis for Kein schöner Land
 Ernst Willner Prize: Clemens J. Setz for Die Waage
 Prize of the Audience: Tilman Rammstedt for Der Kaiser von China
2007 
 Ingeborg Bachmann Prize: Lutz Seiler for Turksib
 Telekom Austria Prize: Thomas Stangl for Ohne Titel ohne Ende
 3sat Prize: Peter Licht for Die Geschichte meiner Einschätzung am Anfang des dritten Jahrtausends
 Ernst Willner Prize: Jan Böttcher for Freundwärts
 Prize of the Audience: Peter Licht for Die Geschichte meiner Einschätzung am Anfang des dritten Jahrtausends
2006 
 Ingeborg Bachmann Prize: Kathrin Passig: Sie befinden sich hier
 Telekom Austria Prize: Bodo Hell for Stadt Land Berg
 3sat Prize: Norbert Scheuer for Überm Rauschen
 Ernst Willner Prize: Angelika Overath for Das Aquarium
 Prize of the Audience: Kathrin Passig: Sie befinden sich hier
2005 
 Ingeborg Bachmann Prize: Thomas Lang: Am Seil
 Telekom Austria Prize: Julia Schoch for Der Ritt durch den Feind
 3sat Prize: Anne Weber for Auszug
 Ernst Willner Prize: Natalie Balkow for Oben, wo nichts mehr ist
 Prize of the Audience: Saša Stanišić for Was wir im Keller spielen …
2004 Uwe Tellkamp: Der Schlaf in den Uhren
2003 Inka Parei: Excerpts from the novel Was Dunkelheit war
2002 Peter Glaser: Geschichte von Nichts
2001 Michael Lentz: Muttersterben
2000 Georg Klein: Excerpt from a long work of prose
1999 Terézia Mora: Der Fall Ophelia
1998 Sibylle Lewitscharoff: PONG.
1997 Norbert Niemann: Wie man's nimmt
1996 Jan Peter Bremer: Der Fürst spricht
1995 Franzobel: Die Krautflut
1994 Reto Hänny: Guai
      Carinthia Prize: Raoul Schrott: Ludwig Höhnel – Totenheft
      3sat Award: Doron Rabinovici: Mullemann
1993 Kurt Drawert: "Haus ohne Menschen. Ein Zustand"
1992 Alissa Walser: "Geschenkt"
1991 Emine Sevgi Özdamar: "Das Leben ist eine Karawanserei"
1990 Birgit Vanderbeke: "Das Muschelessen"
1989 Wolfgang Hilbig: "Eine Übertragung"
1988 Angela Krauß: "Der Dienst"
1987 Uwe Saeger: "Ohne Behinderung, ohne falsche Bewegung"
1986 Katja Lange-Müller: "Kaspar Mauser – Die Feigheit vorm Freund"
1985 Hermann Burger: "Die Wasserfallfinsternis von Bad Gastein"
1984 Erica Pedretti: "Das Modell und sein Maler"
      Award: Thomas Strittmatter: "Der Schwarzwursthammer"
1983 Friederike Roth: From "Das Buch des Lebens"
1982 Jürg Amann: "Rondo"
      Federation of Austrian Industry Prize: Einar Schleef: Wittenbergplatz
1981 Urs Jaeggi: Ruth
1980 Sten Nadolny: Kopenhagen 1801
1979 Gert Hofmann: Die Fistelstimme
      Award: : Apokalypso
1978 Ulrich Plenzdorf: kein runter kein fern
1977 Gert Jonke: Erster Entwurf zum Beginn einer sehr langen Erzählung

See also 
 Ingeborg Bachmann
 German literature
 List of literary awards
 List of poetry awards
 List of years in literature
 List of years in poetry
 Literary award

References

External links

Article on the festival (2010) in the Austrian newspaper Der Standard.

Austrian literary awards
German-language literature
Awards established in 1977
1977 establishments in Austria

Events in Klagenfurt